State Route 156 (SR 156) is a  state highway that runs west-to-east through portions of Floyd and Gordon counties in the northwestern part of the U.S. state of Georgia.

Route description

SR 156 begins at an intersection with U.S. Route 27 (US 27)/SR 1 north of Armuchee in Floyd County. It heads northeast through rural areas until it enters Gordon County. The highway continues to the northeast and curves to the east to Calhoun. The first intersection in Calhoun is SR 136 Connector (River Street). They split, with SR 156 heading to the northeast, and then to the southeast, over a CSX Transportation railroad, to an intersection with US 41/SR 3 (North Wall Street). SR 156 continues to the southeast and heads east to an interchange with Interstate 75 (I-75). The highway heads northeast and east to meet its eastern terminus, an intersection with US 411/SR 61 north of Ranger.

SR 156 is not part of the National Highway System.

Major intersections

See also

References

External links

 Georgia Roads (Routes 141 - 160)

156
Transportation in Floyd County, Georgia
Transportation in Gordon County, Georgia